Major Moves is the thirty-seventh studio album by American musician Hank Williams Jr. It was released by Warner Bros. Records in May 1984. “Attitude Adjustment,” “All My Rowdy Friends Are Coming Over Tonight” and the title track were released as singles. The album reached No. 1 on the Top Country Albums chart and has been certified Platinum by the RIAA.

“All My Rowdy Friends Are Coming Over Tonight”, which would become a hit in its own right, is now best known to football fans as the song Williams would remake as “Are You Ready For Some Football?” for Monday Night Football.

“Promises” was previously recorded by Eric Clapton on his 1978 album Backless.

Commercial and critical success
Major Moves was a significant success for Williams, becoming his first album to reach number one on the Billboard Top Country Albums chart since the 1960s. It also became his eleventh album to be certified Gold and third to be certified Platinum by the RIAA. Williams received a number of prestigious music industry awards during this time, including winning the inaugural Country Music Association and Academy of Country Music awards for Music Video of the Year for “All My Rowdy Friends Are Coming Over Tonight”. The ACM also nominated Williams for Top Male Vocalist, his third nomination for the award, and he received his first nomination for CMA Male Vocalist of the Year. “All My Rowdy Friends Are Coming Over Tonight” became one of Williams’ signature songs and earned him two Grammy nominations, one for Best Country Song and one for Best Country Vocal Performance, Male.

Track listing 
 “All My Rowdy Friends Are Coming Over Tonight” (Hank Williams Jr.) – 2:57
 “Promises” (Richard Feldman, Roger Linn) – 3:00
 “Video Blues” (Williams) – 2:54
 “Major Moves” (Williams) – 3:34
 “Blues Medley: My Starter Won’t Start This Morning; Hold Up Your Head; One Kind Favor; Trouble in Mind (feat. John Lee Hooker & Ray Charles)” (Sam Lightnin’ Hopkins, Elmore James, Blind Lemon Jefferson, Richard M. Jones) – 5:41
 “Mr. Lincoln” (Jimmy Bowen, Williams) – 4:17
 “Country Relaxin’” (Williams) – 2:36
 “Attitude Adjustment” (Williams) – 2:56
 “Knoxville Courthouse Blues” (Williams) – 3:41
 “Wild and Blue” (John Scott Sherrill) – 3:30

Personnel
Matt Betton – drums
Dickey Betts – slide guitar
Mark Casstevens – banjo, tenor banjo
Ray Charles – piano, electric piano, and vocals on track 5
Vernon Derrick – fiddle, mandolin
Bessyl Duhon – concertina
Ray Edenton – acoustic guitar
Hoot Hester – fiddle
John Lee Hooker – vocals on track 5
David Hungate – bass guitar
John Barlow Jarvis – keyboards
Irving Kane – trombone
“Cowboy” Eddie Long – steel guitar
Jerry McKinney – clarinet, soprano saxophone, tenor saxophone
Terry McMillan – harmonica
Terry Mead – trumpet
Kenny Mims – acoustic guitar
Farrell Morris – maracas, marimba, percussion
Lamar Morris – acoustic guitar, electric guitar
Gove Scrivenor – autoharp
Randy Scruggs – dobro, acoustic guitar
James Stroud – percussion
Bobby Thompson – banjo
Steve Tillisch – background vocals
Wayne Turner – acoustic guitar, electric guitar
Billy Joe Walker Jr. – acoustic guitar, electric guitar
Hank Williams Jr. – dobro, electric guitar, keyboards, lead vocals
Reggie Young – electric guitar

Charts

Weekly charts

Year-end charts

Certifications

References 

1984 albums
Hank Williams Jr. albums
Warner Records albums
Albums produced by Jimmy Bowen